Fornham All Saints is a village and civil parish in Suffolk, England in the West Suffolk district. It is north-northwest of the town of Bury St Edmunds and 500m west of Fornham St Genevieve.

The village sign depicts a helmet and crossed swords commemorating two battles that took place here. In c902 King Edward the Elder fought off his cousin, Æthelwold ætheling, to retain the English crown. In 1173 Henry II defeated the Earl of Leicester and a Flemish army at the Battle of Fornham. Today the historic village is more peaceful. It appears on John Speed's 1610 map as "Fernham omnium Sanctorum".

There's evidence of a small prehistoric or Roman settlement near Pigeon Lane, with as many as four hut circles.

The journalist and author Harold Begbie was born in Fornham, St. Martin, in 1871.

The Three Kings pub, closed in March 2020, is on the western outskirts of the village, at the junction of the A1101 and B1106.

References

External links

Villages in Suffolk
Civil parishes in Suffolk
Borough of St Edmundsbury